Hannah Marion Critchlow (born 1980) is a British scientist, writer and broadcaster. Her academic research has focused on cellular and molecular neuroscience. In 2014 the Science Council named her as one of the ten leading "communicator scientists" in the UK. In 2019 Nature listed her as one of Cambridge Universities "Rising Stars in Biological Sciences".

Early life and education

Critchlow decided on a career in neuroscience as a teenager after working as a nursing assistant at St Andrew's Hospital. She studied Cell and Molecular Biology at Brunel University, where she was awarded a First Class degree in 2003 along with three undergraduate University Prizes. While studying at Brunel she had secured a work placement from GlaxoSmithKline, who with the Medical Research Council provided a CASE Award for her doctoral studies at the University of Cambridge.

Career and research

Following completion of her PhD, Critchlow spent a year as a Kingsley Bye-Fellow at Magdalene College, Cambridge and then a further year as a researcher at the Institute for the Future of the Mind, funded by the Oxford Martin School at the University of Oxford. In 2008 she returned to Cambridge, where she has been professionally based ever since, apart from a one-year secondment to the British Neuroscience Association in 2010–2011.

In parallel with her research career, Critchlow began to establish herself as an effective science communicator and public face of science. She took part in a Rising Stars programme run by the University of Cambridge's Public Engagement team in 2011 and, together with the cosmologist Andrew Pontzen, produced a series of Naked Shorts on their research for the award-winning podcast The Naked Scientists. A series of talks developed by Critchlow to take to schools and public festivals led to her giving a talk on "brain myths" at the Hay Literary Festival in 2015 that attracted national and international media interest. This led in turn to her being commissioned by Penguin Books to write an introductory book on Consciousness and to presenting Tomorrow's World Live for the BBC and Family Brain Games. In 2017 Critchlow was appointed as a Science Outreach Fellow by Magdalene College, Cambridge She was a judge for the 2018 Wellcome Book Prize. In 2019 she was elected member of the prestigious European Dana Alliance of the Brain and named by Nature as one of Cambridge University's 'Rising Stars in Life Sciences'  in recognition for her achievements in science engagement. That same year her second book was published called The Science of Fate and made it onto the Sunday Times Bestseller list.

External links 

 hannacritchlow.com

Publications

Books

Selected articles

References

1980 births
Living people
21st-century British biologists
21st-century British women scientists
Alumni of Brunel University London
Alumni of Magdalene College, Cambridge
British women biologists
British neuroscientists
British women neuroscientists